Old Towne Mall was a shopping mall in Torrance, California that did not have department store anchors but was focused on a mix of shopping, amusement and entertainment. It opened on October 9, 1972 and cost $30 million to build, and launched with 142 specialty shops, individual food vendors and artisans.

Features
Different parts of the mall were themed, for instance the Old West, or turn-of-the-20th-century U.S. The mall featured:
"Artisan Way", a wing with glassblowers, weavers, potters, clockmakers and jewelry craftsmen

Turn-of-the-20th-century-themed Wax Museum

Old Towne Mall Little Theater

Antique streetlights from Long Beach (placed indoors)
A singing security guard
A refurbished cable car
A working carousel
Indoor forest-themed ride
Special events like 
Dance marathons, frog jumping contests, bingo games and armwrestling tournaments, civil war reenactment
Christmastime elves
Arts festivals
Concerts
Puppet shows
Costumed bands and Old Towne Singers performing at an old-fashioned gazebo

Decline
The mall could not effectively compete with nearby Del Amo Fashion Center and the South Bay Galleria. By 1982, the owners remodeled the mall for $3.8 million remodel and added two big box anchors, Marshalls and Dayton Hudson’s then-new "Plums", which opened in Sept. 1983. The name was changed to Old Town Place. The Federated Group electronics store closed in 1989; the electronics and appliance store Silo replaced it but went out of business in 1995.

Conversion to power center
By 1989 the  mall was roughly a third vacant and the city approved its conversion to an outdoor power center format. Only the carousel remained from the earlier attractions after the 1990 remodel when the remodel. In 1994, the carousel was moved to the Eastwood Mall in Niles, Ohio. The center was renamed first Torrance Citiplex, then Torrance Promenade. Trader Joe’s was added  in November 2002.

References

Shopping malls in the South Bay, Los Angeles
Buildings and structures in Torrance, California
Demolished shopping malls in the United States